Seven and a Half is a 2006 Serbian dark comedy film directed by Miroslav Momčilović.

Plot
The film shows the everyday lives of people in Belgrade who are obsessed with their weaknesses and led by their passions. Seven independent stories on the seven deadly sins are told in a comical tone.

Greed: Keboja and Radule hatch a scheme to extract money from Diego Maradona by asking him to financially help them out with a fake health problem. However, the amount of money they are going to ask for keeps rising, side by side with their greed and plans for the future.

Wrath: Tadija is a bodybuilder with a sole goal to get revenge against a convict who embarrassed him five years ago.

Lust: Obrad and Radoje are two pedophiles who meet when they get in touch over e-mail, both posing as little girls.

Gluttony: Adam and Verica are frequent visitors of events with free food and drinks where they eat and drink as much as they can. Their gluttony leads them to an event with interesting food...

Pride: Srđan and Zorica are a married couple who are 3 questions away from the prize in a quiz worth 4 million Serbian dinars. However, Zorica can't acknowledge the fact that her husband is the only one answering the questions, who seemingly knows everything.

Sloth: Simka and Konda are two thieves trying to rob a flat after the owners leave. Elevators in the building don't work, so they have to climb 23 floors which proves to be too much for them.

Envy: Musa and Banjac (who both also appear in the first 2 stories, sitting in the same place) envy Bure, a Bosnian emigrant, for owning a restaurant and driving a good looking Mercedes. They provoke him until a tragedy happens to Bure.

Cast 
 Branislav Trifunović - Keboja
 Nikola Vujović - Radule
 Miloš Timotijević - Tadija
 Marija Karan - Koviljka
 Branko Vidaković - Obrad
 Boris Komnenić - Radoje
 Nenad Jezdić - Adam
 Gordan Kičić - Srdjan
 Natasa Marković - Verica
 Ljubinka Klarić - Zorica
 Milan Gutović - Voditelj
 Nikola Đuričko - Simke
 Boris Milivojević - Konda
 Mira Stupica - Milica

References

External links
 

2006 films
Serbian black comedy films
Films set in Belgrade
Films shot in Belgrade
Seven deadly sins in popular culture
Cultural depictions of Diego Maradona